Earl of Northampton is a title in the Peerage of England that has been created five times.

Earls of Northampton, First Creation (1071)

Waltheof (d. 1076)
Maud, Queen of Scotland (c.1074–1130/31)
Simon II de Senlis (1103–1153)
Simon III de Senlis (1138–1184)

Earls of Northampton, Second Creation (1337)
William de Bohun, 1st Earl of Northampton (c. 1310 – 1360)
Humphrey de Bohun, 2nd Earl of Northampton (and 7th Earl of Hereford) (1341–1373), earldom abeyant

Earl of Northampton, Second Creation (restored) (1384)

Henry Bolingbroke, 3rd Earl of Northampton (1367–1413) earldom restored 1384; became king in 1399

Earl of Northampton, Third Creation (1399) 

 Anne of Gloucester, Countess of Northampton (1383-1438)

Earl of Northampton, Fourth Creation (1604)

Henry Howard, Earl of Northampton (1540–1614)

Earls of Northampton, Fifth Creation (1618)
See the Marquess of Northampton

See also
Earl of Huntingdon (1065 creation)

External links
 

Earldoms in England before 1066
Earldoms in the Peerage of England
Extinct earldoms in the Peerage of England
British and Irish peerages which merged in the Crown
Noble titles created in 1071
Noble titles created in 1337
Noble titles created in 1399
Noble titles created in 1604
Noble titles created in 1618